Offroad Legends is a series of racing video games which utilize pseudo-3D graphics released initially in 2012 for mobile platforms.

Gameplay 
The mechanics of the game involve off-road racing in various all-terrain vehicles. The game also features high-definition 3D graphics as a result of being built with the Horde3D engine. The underlying engine allows for vehicle and terrain deformation and also has retina display for iOS.

Sequels 
 Offroad Legends: Sahara: is a free-to-play sequel to the original due to its positive reception.
 Offroad Legends: Warmup: is the latest in the series released in December 2013.

Reception 
The game has received fairly positive reviews since its release. slide to Play gives the game a 3 out of 4 stating it builds off of solid mobile racing mechanics. modojo has also given the game a positive review  because of its solid gameplay and well performing mechanics. PocketGamer gave a less than average review of the game stating poor level design giving the game a rating of 7/10. The game has a Metascore of 76 based on 4 critics. The game currently holds a 76.25% on GameRankings.

External links

References 

2012 video games
IOS games
PlayStation 3 games
PlayStation Portable games
Windows games
Xbox 360 games
Android (operating system) games
Windows Mobile games
Video games developed in Hungary
Racing video games